Tir na n'Og is the debut album of the Serbian Irish folk/Celtic rock band Tir na n'Og released in 2006. It was the band's only Irish folk/Celtic rock-oriented album, as in 2008 they changed their name to Alfapop and moved towards power pop.

Track listing

Personnel 
Jovana Vujnović - vocals
Jovan Dragumilo - guitar
Miroslav Kočić - violin
Ranko Radovanov - bass guitar
Miloš Jokić - drums

Additional personnel 
Srđan Tanasković - keyboards (on tracks: 4, 9)
Srđan Grujičić - acoustic guitar (on track 6)
Mladen Miloradović - cello (on track 8)

References 

 Tir na n'Og at Discogs

External links 
 Tir na n'Og at Discogs

Alfapop albums
2006 debut albums
One Records (Serbia) albums
Serbian-language albums